The East Africa cricket team played three ODIs in the 1975 World Cup, with 14 players representing East Africa in these matches. A One Day International is an international cricket match between two representative teams, each having ODI status, as determined by the International Cricket Council (ICC).

The East Africa cricket team was first formed in 1958. East Africa were invited to compete in the 1975 World Cup in England and the team included players from Kenya, Uganda and Tanzania. East Africa played its first ODI against New Zealand at Edgbaston.  The team played two further ODIs during the tournament against India at Headingley and England at Edgbaston.  East Africa struggled against the Test playing nations in their group, losing heavily in all their ODIs.  East Africa continued to play in the ICC Trophy in 1982 and 1986, however East Africa ceased to be a member of the ICC in 1989 when it was amalgamated into the East and Central Africa cricket team.  Kenya became a member of the ICC in their own right in 1981.

This list includes all players who have played at least one ODI match and is initially arranged in the order of debut appearance. Where more than one player won their first cap in the same match, those players are initially listed alphabetically at the time of debut.

Key

Players

To sort this table by any statistic, click on the  icon up to the column title.

References

East Africa ODI